Cumberland County is a county located in the U.S. state of Tennessee. As of the 2020 census, the population was 61,145. Its county seat is Crossville. Cumberland County comprises the Crossville, TN micropolitan statistical area.

History
Cumberland County was formed in 1856 from parts of Bledsoe, Roane, Morgan, Fentress, Rhea, Putnam, Overton, and White.  During the Civil War, the county was nearly evenly split between those supporting the Union and those supporting the Confederacy.

In 1787, the North Carolina legislature ordered widening and improvements to Avery's Trace, the trail that ran from North Carolina through Knoxville and what is now Cumberland County to Nashville. They raised funds by a lottery and completed a project that built a wagon road. This slightly improved travel, but still required a bone jarring trip. The road was often muddy and crossed stone slabs so that it was only passable in some places on foot. Reportedly wagons could not get down the steep grade at Spencer's Mountain without locking brakes on all wheels and dragging a tree behind to slow the descent. The mountain top was described as "quite denuded of trees."

Cumberland County was the site of an important saltpeter mine.  Saltpeter is the main ingredient of gunpowder and was obtained by leaching the earth from Grassy Cove Saltpeter Cave.  Richard Green Waterhouse settled in this area in 1800.  In his "Diary, Journal, and Memoirs" he states that he went with William Kelly into Grassy cove and explored his (Kelly's) saltpeter cave on October 7, 1812.

According to Barr (1961), Dicky Mathews began the manufacture of gunpowder at the cave in 1859.  His son was killed by an explosion at Powder House Spring below the cave.  This is an exceptionally large cave and evidence of mining extends far from the entrance.  The leaching vats were located in a large room near the entrance, but this room is damp and the wooden vats have deteriorated to the point that they are difficult to recognize.

During the 1930s, as part of the New Deal, the federal government's Subsistence Homesteads Division established the Cumberland Homesteads outside of Crossville.  The program provided land and houses for 250 impoverished families.  Cumberland Mountain State Park was built as part of this project.

Geography
It is the fourth-largest county in Tennessee by area. The county is located atop the Cumberland Plateau. The southernmost of the Cumberland Mountains, known locally as the Crab Orchard Mountains, rise in the northeastern part of the county.

The county is home to a number of karst formations, most notably at Grassy Cove, a  large, closed depression located southeast of Crossville.  It is 3 miles wide, 5 miles long, and over 1,000 feet deep.  All of the water draining into Grassy Cove flows underground through a large cave system and emerges 4 miles southwest at the head of the Sequatchie Valley to form the Sequatchie River.

The Tennessee Divide, where the watersheds of the Cumberland River and the Tennessee River meet, passes through the county.  The source of the Caney Fork is located west of the divide, while the source of the Obed River is located east of the divide.

Adjacent counties

Fentress County (north)
Morgan County (northeast/EST Border)
Roane County (east/EST Border)
Rhea County (southeast/EST Border)
Bledsoe County (south)
Van Buren County (southwest)
White County (west)
Putnam County (northwest)

National protected area
 Obed Wild and Scenic River (part)

State protected areas

 Bledsoe State Forest (part)
 Catoosa Wildlife Management Area (part)
 Cumberland Mountain State Park
 Cumberland Trail (part)
 Keyes-Harrison Wildlife Management Area
 Luper Mountain Wildlife Management Area
 Mount Roosevelt Wildlife Management Area (part)
 Ozone Falls State Natural Area

Demographics

2020 census

As of the 2020 United States census, there were 61,145 people, 25,801 households, and 17,692 families residing in the county.

2010 census
As of the census of 2010, there were 56,053 people, 23,791 households, and 16,954 families residing in the county.  The population density was 82.3 people per square mile (32.1/km2).

There were 28,151 housing units at an average density of 41.3 per square mile (16.1/km2). The racial makeup of the county was 96.08% White, 0.3% Black or African American, 0.3% Native American, 0.4% Asian, 0.1% Pacific Islander, 1.1% from other races, and 1% from two or more races. 2.3% of the population were Hispanic or Latino of any race.

According to the 2014 American Community Survey the largest ancestry groups in Cumberland County were German (15%), American (14.8%), Irish (12.9%), and English (11.8%).

There were 23,791 households, out of which 24.7% had children under the age of 18 living with them, 57.4% were married couples living together, 9.7% had a female householder with no husband present, 4.2% had a male householder with no wife present, and 28.7% were non-families. 24.4% of all households were one-person, and 11.9% had someone living alone who was 65 years of age or older. The average household size was 2.33 and the average family size was 2.72.

The population was distributed by age as follows, with 19.1% under the age of 18, 6.6% from 18 to 24, 20% from 25 to 44, 28.4% from 45 to 64, and 26% who were 65 years of age or older. The median age was 48.3 years. For every 100 females there were 95.5 males.  For every 100 females age 18 and over, there were 92.9 males.

According to the 2000 census, the median income for a household in the county was $30,901, and the median income for a family was $35,928. Males had a median income of $26,559 versus $20,644 for females. The per capita income for the county was $16,808.  About 11.10% of families and 14.70% of the population were below the poverty line, including 21.80% of those under age 18 and 9.30% of those age 65 or over.

Education
The Cumberland County School District oversees two high schools, nine elementary schools, and one charter school. Schools include Cumberland County & Stone Memorial High Schools.

Communities

Cities
Crab Orchard
Crossville (county seat)

Town
Pleasant Hill

Census-designated places
Bowman
Fairfield Glade
Lake Tansi
Mayland

Unincorporated communities

 Alloway
 Bowling
 Grassy Cove
 Midway
 Ozone
 Renegade Mountain

 Westel, Tennessee

Politics
Like all of East Tennessee, Cumberland County is powerfully Republican, and has generally been favorable to that party ever since the Civil War. Five Democratic presidential candidates have won the county since then, but none have reached 52 percent of the county's ballots.

See also
National Register of Historic Places listings in Cumberland County, Tennessee

References

External links

 Official site
 Crossville-Cumberland County Chamber of Commerce
 Cumberland County Schools
 Cumberland County, TNGenWeb – genealogy resources 

Uplands (Cumberland County, Tenn.) Records, 1847-2005, Tennessee State Library and Archives

 
1855 establishments in Tennessee
Counties of Appalachia
East Tennessee